Steen River is an impact structure in Alberta, Canada. The crater is not exposed at the surface. The crater was partially eroded prior to burial, and lies under  of sediments.

References

External links
Exploration of the Steen River crater

Further reading 
 Niccoli, M., Hildebrand, A.R. and Lawton D.C. (2005) "Seismic Velocity Study of the Rim Uplift of the Steen River Impact Crater" Lunar and Planetary Science XXXVI.

Impact craters of Alberta
Cretaceous impact craters
Cretaceous Canada
Mackenzie County